Prohor is a 2002 Bengali feature film directed by Subhadro Chowdhury. The film is based on Dulendra Bhowmick's short story Dash Number Bed. The cinematographer of the film was Amlan Dutta. It revolves around a nurse who, in one night, discovers that there is a patient in her hospital, who once raped her brutally. It stars Debashree Roy in the central character. The film was edited by Saurav Sharangi and the background score was composed by Chiradeep Dasgupta.

The film was critically appreciated and has often been considered as the best of Debashree Roy. Indian film historian S. Theodore Bhaskaran listed this film into his choice of ten best Indian films. Several film critics have considered this film stodgy and unwieldy. It bagged Indira Gandhi Award for Best Debut Film of a Director in 2002. It was released in some limited halls in 2002.

Synopsis
Nandita who is a nurse by her profession encounters an emergent case of a bomb blast. The patient is a bomb blast victim and a criminal under police protection.

Cast

 Debashree Roy as Nandita
 Alokananda Roy as Nandita's mother
 Barun Chanda as Doctor Sengupta
 Shilajit as Sarit
 Chaiti Ghoshal as Seema
 Rajatava Dutta as Biltu
 Manjushree Ganguly as Tuku
 Ritwik

Awards

References

External links
 

Bengali-language Indian films
Best Debut Feature Film of a Director National Film Award winners
2000s Bengali-language films
2004 films
Films scored by Indradeep Dasgupta